The Palisades Mountain House was a hotel located atop The Palisades in Englewood Cliffs, New Jersey during the late 19th century. It was destroyed by fire in 1884.

Subsequent development
The site of the former Palisades Mountain House became Archangel College in June 1962. It was renamed Englewood Cliffs College in 1966. In 1975, it became part of St. Peter's College (now Saint Peter's University).

References

Sources

External links 
 

Hotel buildings completed in 1860
Englewood Cliffs, New Jersey
Burned hotels in the United States
Hotels disestablished in 1884
Hotels in New Jersey
Defunct hotels in New Jersey
Victorian architecture in New Jersey